Encrinidae is an extinct family of crinoids belonging to the order Encrinida.

These stationary epifaunal suspension feeders lived during the Silurian-Triassic periods. Fossils of this family have been found in the sediments of Austria, China, Germany, Hungary, Italy, New Zealand, Poland, Spain, Switzerland and, United States.

Genera
Carnallicrinus
Cassianocrinus
Chelocrinus
Encrinus
Zardinicrinus

References

Prehistoric echinoderm families
Prehistoric crinoids
Extinct animals of Europe
Triassic crinoids
Triassic first appearances
Triassic extinctions